Jolson Sings Again is a 1949 American musical biographical film directed by Henry Levin, and the sequel to The Jolson Story (1946), both of which cover the life of singer Al Jolson. It was the highest-grossing film of 1949 and received three Oscar nominations at the 22nd Academy Awards.

Synopsis
In this follow-up to The Jolson Story, we pick up the singer's career just as he has returned to the stage after a premature retirement. But his wife has left him and the appeal of the spotlight is not what it used to be. This time Jolson (Larry Parks) trades in the stage for life in the fast lane: women, horses, travel. His father (Ludwig Donath) becomes increasingly concerned about his frivolous lifestyle. With the death of his mother (Tamara Shayne) and the beginning of World War II, Jolson comes back to earth—and returns to the stage.

Once again teamed with manager Steve Martin (William Demarest), Jolson travels the world entertaining troops everywhere from Alaska to Africa. When he finally collapses from exhaustion it takes young, pretty nurse Ellen Clark (Barbara Hale) to show him there is more to life than "just rushing around".

Cast

Credited
Larry Parks as Al Jolson / Larry Parks
Barbara Hale as Ellen Clark
William Demarest as Steve Martin
Ludwig Donath as Cantor Yoelson
Bill Goodwin as Tom Baron
Myron McCormick as Ralph Bryant
Tamara Shayne as Moma Yoelson

Uncredited
 Eric Wilton as Henry
 Helen Mowery as Script Girl

Reception
Jolson Sings Again was eagerly awaited by moviegoers who remembered The Jolson Story, and hundreds of theaters showed the sequel to excellent response.

Reviews
"Jolson Sings Again bids fair to par The Jolson Story grosses and may even top them. In short, a smasheroo of unqualified proportions." "...Jolson's voice is still a formidable, awesome, and grandiously captivating instrument."

"There is heart, humor, tragedy and a warm sprinkling of sentiment in Mr. Buchman's story. Much of the latter is conjured up by a succession of nostalgic songs which run all through the film and are sung in grand style by Mr. Jolson himself. The vitality of the Jolson voice is suitably matched in the physical representation provided by Larry Parks, who by now comes close to perfection in aping the vigorous expression with which Jolson tacks a song."

Commentary
"Jolson Sings Again is a well-made sequel to The Jolson Story. In some ways, it betters the original. If anything, Jolson's voice sounds even better in this movie, and Larry Parks' Jolson is a warmer, more human character here."

In this sequel, the story reaches the point in Jolson's life where the film of his life is to be made (first film: The Jolson Story), and in preparation for the film Jolson meets the actor who is to portray him. In what is probably a cinema first, Parks plays both Jolson and himself (the young Larry Parks) as they meet in a split-screen scene.

Awards and nominations

Footnotes

External links

The Al Jolson web site

1949 films
1940s biographical films
1949 musical films
American biographical films
American musical films
Biographical films about singers
Blackface minstrel shows and films
Columbia Pictures films
1940s English-language films
Films scored by George Duning
Films scored by Morris Stoloff
Films about musical theatre
Films directed by Henry Levin
Jukebox musical films
Musical films based on actual events
Films with screenplays by Sidney Buchman
Cultural depictions of Al Jolson
1940s American films